Casaletto Vaprio is a comune (municipality) in the Province of Cremona in the Italian region Lombardy, located about  east of Milan and about  northwest of Cremona. Notable natives include the composer Stefano Pavesi.

Casaletto Vaprio borders the following municipalities: Campagnola Cremasca, Capralba, Cremosano, Quintano, Trescore Cremasco.

Transportation 
Casaletto Vaprio has a railway station on the Treviglio–Cremona line.

References

Cities and towns in Lombardy